Lauriston is a locality in Victoria, Australia.

Lauriston Post Office opened on 1 July 1864 after gold was discovered in the area and closed in 1969. In 2019 Australian folk musician, Alana Wilkinson, recorded a single, "Partner in Crime", at the community's church.

References

External links

Towns in Victoria (Australia)
Shire of Macedon Ranges
Mining towns in Victoria (Australia)